Samuel Guo Chuan-zhen (April 14, 1918 – November 6, 2012) was the auxiliary bishop of the Roman Catholic Archdiocese of Jinan, China.

Ordained a bishop without papal mandate in 1988, he later received it. Guo Chuan-zhen also established a seminary.

Notes

1918 births
2012 deaths
20th-century Roman Catholic bishops in China
People from Jinan